BEM Higher Secondary School (Basel Evangelical Mission Higher Secondary School (previously High School)), Parappanangadi is located at Parappanangadi Municipality in Malappuram district, Kerala, India.  

The school started as a primary school in 1904, as the area's population was largely without education.  The Basel Evangelical Mission started missionary work in South India in 1839.

The school was known as the B.G.M. (Basel German Mission) Elementary School by 1910.  Cheramangalam Mana gave approximately four acres for a school playground.  In the mid-1940s, the Parappanangadi High School committee gave the school rights allotted to it by the then Madras Government to the Basel Evangelical Mission, which allowed the school to become a high school.  The school was renamed B.E.M. High School in 1947.   

The school is now supervised by the Church of South India Corporate Management (Malabar and Wayanad).

In 2007, BEM High School celebrated its centenary anniversary.(19 April 2007). B.E.M. High School centenary fete concludes on Saturday, The Hindu 

The Kerala State Government has approved a Higher secondary division for BEM High School from year 2010. It is now known as BEM Higher Secondary School, Parappanangadi. The Education Minister of Kerala, P. K. Abdu Rabb is an alumnus of the school.

References

Church of South India schools
Primary schools in Kerala
High schools and secondary schools in Kerala
Christian schools in Kerala
Schools in Malappuram district
Educational institutions established in 1904
1904 establishments in India